Paul Anthony Barker (born 1961) is an Australian bishop in the Anglican Church of Australia. He has served as an assistant bishop in the Anglican Diocese of Melbourne, as the Bishop for the Jumbunna Episcopate (covering the outer southern and eastern suburbs of Melbourne, since November 2016.

Barker trained as an actuary before studying theology at Ridley College in Melbourne. He graduated from there in 1989 before being ordained as deacon and priest in 1990.

Barker then served in parish ministry throughout the Diocese of Melbourne, including as vicar of Holy Trinity Doncaster from 1996-2009, Archdeacon of Box Hill for eight years from 2001 and as a visiting lecturer at Ridley College for nearly 20 years. During this time, he spent three years in England between 1993 and 1996 completing a PhD at the University of Bristol on the book of Deuteronomy.

Between 2009 and 2016, Barker worked in south and southeast Asia, his roles including visiting scholar at Seminari Theoloji Malaysia and adjunct lecturer at Myanmar Evangelical Graduate School of Theology. He was also the Asian Regional Coordinator for Langham Preaching Scholar Care, in which role he has trained preachers in the region, including India, Pakistan, Myanmar and Thailand. Since returning to Australia, Barker has served as a Director of Langham Partnership Australia.

On 1 April 2016, it was announced that Barker had been appointed as an assistant bishop in the Diocese of Melbourne in charge of the Jumbunna Episcopate, replacing Paul White who moved to a part-time role as Assistant Bishop for Growth Areas Ministry. He was consecrated by Archbishop Philip Freier as bishop and appointed to the role on 12 November 2016.

References

21st-century Anglican bishops in Australia
Alumni of Ridley College, Melbourne
Assistant bishops in the Anglican Diocese of Melbourne
Evangelical Anglican bishops
Living people
1961 births